People Music is an album by pianist Donald Brown which was recorded in 1990 and released on the Muse label.

Reception

The AllMusic review by Scott Yanow stated "Fine '90 date by a Memphis pianist. He plays nice bluesy chords and gospel-influenced phrases, but is also an effective straight-ahead and hard bop improviser. He's backed by a large group that features an interesting configuration with a trumpet/alto sax/vibes front line, and also uses vocals at times".

Track listing
All compositions by Donald Brown except where noted
 "Biscuit Man" – 3:47
 "Gaslight"  (Duke Pearson) – 6:23
 "Prism" – 5:03
 "Reruns from the Sixties" – 9:02
 "Over at Herbie's Juke Joint" – 5:43
 "I Love It When You Dance That Way" (Donald Brown, Dorothy Brown) – 5:45
 "Graylon" – 6:57
 "Booker T." – 5:43
 "Intensive Care Unit (I.C.U.)" (James Williams) – 4:42

Personnel
Donald Brown – piano 
Tom Harrell – trumpet, flugelhorn
Vincent Herring – flute, soprano saxophone, alto saxophone 
Steve Nelson – vibraphone
Robert Hurst – bass 
Samurai Celestial – drums, vocals
Daniel G. Sadownick– percussion
Lenora Zenzalai Helm – vocals (track 6)

References

1991 albums
Donald Brown (musician) albums
Muse Records albums